Harileh (also Romanized as Harīleh) is a village in Dinavar Rural District, Dinavar District, Sahneh County, Kermanshah Province, Iran. At the 2006 census, its population was 76, in 17 families.

References 

Populated places in Sahneh County